Elisabetta de Gambarini (7 September 1730 – 9 February 1765) was an English composer, mezzo-soprano, organist, harpsichordist, pianist, orchestral conductor and painter of the 18th century. Elisabetta's music is considered late Baroque and Classical music. She achieved distinction as an all-around musician, performing on, and composing for a variety of instruments as well as voice. Her compositions were known to reflect that of vocal work instead of instrumental patterns. She was the first female composer in Britain to publish a collection of keyboard music.

Family 
Elisabetta de Gambarini was born 7 September 1730 in Holles Street, St Marylebone, Middlesex, England. She was born to Charles Gambarini (died 1754), Counsellor to the Landgrave of Hessen-Kassel and Joanna (Giovanna Paula) Stradiotti (died 1774). Her father was a nobleman from Lucca, Italy.  He published A Description of the Earl of Pembroke's Pictures in 1731. Her mother was of similar status from Dalmatia. Her mother may have been a tutor to the nobility but it is not certain. Elisabetta was the third of four children. She was the only sibling to survive to maturity. It is possible that her name has appeared several other ways, Elizabeth Gambarini, Elisabetta de Gambarini, Elisabetta Gambarini and Elisabetta Gamberini.

Marriage 
On 20 March 1764 Elisabetta married Etienne Chazal at St Martin-in-the-Fields. She gave one concert as Mrs Chazal in May, but died at her home in Castle Court, Strand, in the parish of St Martin-in-the-Fields, Westminster, less than a year later, on 9 February 1765. She was buried at St James's, Westminster, on 14 February. Her mother's will reveals that Elisabetta had a daughter, Giovanna Georgiana Chazal. Elisabetta may have died in or as a result of childbirth but it is not known for certain. This was common during this time but would soon change with the increased number of women being trained as midwives. There is no additional information known of either her husband or her daughter.

Education 
There is no specific information regarding Elisabetta de Gambarini's formal musical education, however there is speculation that she may have studied with Francesco Geminiani, composer of The Inchanted Forest.

There was increased participation of women in music-making in the eighteenth century. It is known that French women undertook music instruction at a young age, under the guidance of a music master before marriage and family responsibilities intervened. Many women involved in music were noblewomen or were from families of other musicians. It is known that during the Classical period the number of women involved in domestic music making increased significantly because of the popularity of singing and playing the piano, and also because the middle class was expanding.

Music was considered a social accomplishment for women, which reflected on the gentility of one's family, filled leisure time and drove away ennui, and in the case of a young women, it was an asset in procuring a husband. Amateur musicians as well as trained professionals were playing. Young ladies became involved in music by playing concerts in their homes and later as court musicians. They sang and played the lute or the harpsichord for their private amusement and occasionally retained small staffs of musicians -perhaps even including a composer – for their own entertainments. The lute and the harpsichord by their nature were sufficient unto themselves or could serve to support the player's own voice. Playing bowed string instruments was less appealing as a pastime because of the unladylike position required for playing the larger bowed string instruments.  Because of this, many eighteenth century women took up the smallest member of the viol family, the pardessus.

Career 
Elisabetta began her career singing in Handel's Occasional Oratorio (1746–1747). She also performed as the First Israelite Woman at the first performance and sang in Judas Maccabaeus (1747) and Joseph and his Brethren (1747).  Her name also appears in scores of Handel's Samson and Messiah; however the exact dates are unknown.

By 1748 Elisabetta's reputation allowed her to promote and perform her own benefit concert. She sang and played her own compositions with the organ. She also issued her first two volumes of music. She was the first female composer in Britain to publish a collection of keyboard music, The Six Sets of Lessons for the Harpsichord, published in her teens, dedicated to Viscountess Howe of the Kingdom of Ireland. Her music had many subscribers, among them were famous musicians, Handel and Francesco Geminiani as well as dukes, lawyers, barons, sirs, lords as well as captains.  Later that year she published Lessons for the Harpsichord Intermix'd with Italian and English Songs, dedicated to the Prince of Wales. Later she also published XII English & Italian Songs, for a German flute and Thorough Bass...Opera III in 1750 composed primarily for woodwind players and dedicated to the Duke of Marlborough.

Throughout her career Elisabetta performed at the Haymarket Theatre and the great Concert Room in Dean Street, Soho.  Later in her career she gave several benefit concerts, appearing as composer, harpsichordist, organist, and singer. During one of her benefit concerts, she borrowed Francesco Geminiani's score The Inchanted Forest, for this reason there are those that believe she could have been one of his students. There is also information that she may have sought a court appointment during this time.

Women in music 
As the eighteenth century progressed, the social class of the women who composed music and what they chose to compose changed. Whereas seventeenth century noble women wrote simple songs for their families and friends to perform, the daughters of musicians and composers gradually began composing in more ambitious genres:  sacred and secular Cantata and cantatille, opera, ballet, Comic opera, and even Oratorio. We do know that many women were achieving musically during this time period. The greater participation of women in music, traditionally associated exclusively with men, is largely attributable to political and social happenings across Europe in the early to mid-eighteenth century.

Significant and far reaching developments in music are also credited to the invention of the piano and its concomitant solo and chamber literature- which also played a decisive role in creating a musical climate conducive to a greater involvement of women as composers. The lied also attracted many female composers, resulting in many fine pieces of music written by women. From its inception the lied constituted a type of chamber music and as such fit comfortably in a domestic environment, a setting in which women had long been accepted as performers, in clear contrast to the public area, whose large scale Operas, sacred music and Orchestral music had been off limits to women. It is unclear if Elisabetta de Gambarini composed lied music; however, we do know that other female composers such as Corona Schröter and Maria Theresia Paradis were lied composers.

Repertoire 
Elisabetta's Six Sets of Lessons for the Harpsichord are pleasant two-voice compositions (except for the March in Sonata IV, which is in three voices). In 1759 she published three sets of songs and harpsichord pieces between 1748 and 1750. (Songs 1–4 are English, 5 is French, 6–12 are Italian.) They are short pieces, the longest being 53 measures, not counting repeats. The lyrics were based on moral lessons or classical allusions. Eighteenth-century concert programmes usually did not have consecutive pieces in the same genre. The forty minutes of music may also have been too short in length for an entire concert. Interrupting the music for the performance of songs or keyboard pieces may therefore have been a good solution. The word intermixed in the title of Elisabetta de Gambarini's Opus 2: Lessons for the Harpsichord Intermix'd with Italian and English evince many of the characteristics of vocal writing; a textual basis, compact range, strophic style, abbreviated length, and the absence of multi-movement structure. Like other pieces of this genre, her songs could be performed in a variety of ways: by voice, flute, keyboard, voice and flute together alternating segments. Her writing style was simple with uncomplicated keyboard writing, many being spirited and attractive.
 The Six Sets of Lessons for the Harpsichord (Op. 1), 1748
 Lessons for the Harpsichord Intermix'd with Italian and English Songs (Op. 2), 1748
 XII English & Italian Songs, for a German flute and Thorough Bass...Opera III
 War March
 Victory for voice and organ
 Forest Scene for horns and timpani
 Tho Mars, Still Friends to France
 The Friendly Wish
 Forgive Ye Fair
 Honour, Riches, Marriage-Blessing from The Tempest
 Overture for French horns
 Overtures
 Organ concertos
 Solos for piano and violin
 Ode for chorus

Instruments played 
Violin, Harpsichord, Piano, Organ

Recordings 
 18th Century Women Composers – Music for Solo Harpsichord, Vol. 1. Barbara Harbach, harpsichord. Gasparo Records GSCD-272 (1995)
 Anthony Noble, Elizabeth Gambarini: Complete Works for Harpsichord. Herald Records HAVPCD 244 (2000)

References

Further reading 
 Bowers, Jane & Tick, Judith. Women Making Music, The Western Art Tradition 1150–1950. Urbana and Chicago: University of Illinois Press, 1986
 Briscoe, James R. A Biography Dictionary of Actor, Actresses, Musicians, Dancers, Managers & Other Stage Personnel in London 1660–1800. Music Library Association, Inc., 56, 4 (2000):  1014
 Dees, Pamela Youngdahl. An annotated catalogue of available intermediate-level keyboard music by women composers born before 1900. D.M.A. dissertation, University of Miami, 1998.
 Gambarini, Elisabetta de. Six sonatas for harpsichord or piano. Pullman, WA: Vivace Press, 1994.
 Gelbart, Nina Rattner.  The King's Midwife A History of Madame du Coudray. Berkeley: University of California Press, 1998.
 Gowen, Bradford. New Music for Performance: Six Sonatas for Harpsichord or Piano by Elisabetta De Gambarini; Six Lessons by Elizabeth Harden. Edited by Barbara Harbach. Piano & Keyboard, January/February 1996, 51. Accessed *3 May 2016.
 Jezic, Diane P. Women Composers. New York: The Feminist Press at The City University of New York, 1988.
 Mathiesen, Penelope. Elisabetta De Gambarini: The Vocal Option. Continuo 16, no. 2 (2 April 1992).
 Neuls-Bates, Carol. Women in Music. Boston : Northeastern University Press, 1996.
 Noble, Anthony F. A Contextual Study of the Life and Published Keyboard Works of Elisabetta de Gambarini, Together with a Recording, Facsimile of the Music, and Commentary. PhD dissertation, University of Southampton (King Alfred’s College Winchester), 2000.
 Noble, Anthony F. Gambarini (married name Chazal), Elizabeth (Elisabetta de Gambarini)  (1730–1765), composer, keyboard player, and singer. Oxford Dictionary of National Biography (2004): Accessed 30 March 2016.
 Pendle, Karin. Women & Music. Second ed. Bloomington : Indiana University Press, 1991, 2001.
 Rasch, Rudolf. The Thirty-Three Works of Francesco Geminiani, Work Twenty, The Inchanted Forest (1754/1761). My Work on the Internet, Vol 8 (April 2016)
 Smith, Charles, & Georges, Patrick.  Similarity indices for 500 classical music composers:  Inferences from personal musical influences and ‘ecological’ measures. Empirical Studies of the Arts 33, 1 (2015) : 61–94.
 Winton, Dean.  Gambarini, Elisabetta de. Grove Music Online (2001): Accessed 30 March 2016.  doi: 10.1093/gmo/9781561592630.article.10600

External links 

 
 Thesis on Gambarini by Anthony Noble.
 Harbach, B. "Six Sonatas for Harpsichord or Piano." Vivace. Barbara Harbach, 2007. Web. 26 April 2016.
 Johnson, K. "Elisabetta Di Gambirini." All Music. All Music, 2016. Web. 26 April 2016.
 Yelloly, M. "Early Music." Project MUSE. Early Music, Feb. 2005. Web. 26 April 2016.

Classical-period composers
English classical composers
British women classical composers
1730 births
1765 deaths
18th-century classical composers
Musicians from London
English people of Italian descent
18th-century English singers
18th-century keyboardists
English sopranos
English organists
English harpsichordists
Women organists
18th-century English musicians
18th-century women composers
18th-century English women
18th-century English people
English women painters